The 1934 Kakanj mine disaster was a mining accident on 21 April 1934 at a Kakanj coal mine in Kakanj, Kingdom of Yugoslavia. The accident occurred in the "Stara jama" shaft when an explosion killed 127 of 128 miners working on the third (lowest) level.

Background
This was not the first, nor the last large-scale accident in the Kakanj coal mine. In 1916, 19 miners were killed in the same "Stara jama" shaft, and in 1965, 128 miners were killed in an explosion in the "Orasi" shaft.

The "Stara jama" shaft was opened in 1900 as the first modern coal mining shaft in Bosnia.

Sources

See also
1965 Kakanj mine disaster
Dobrnja-Jug mine disaster

External links
Velika rudarska nesreća u Kaknju – 21. travanj 1934. godine

Coal mining disasters in Bosnia and Herzegovina
1934 mining disasters
1934 in Yugoslavia
History of Kakanj